Four Seasons Hotel Houston is a hotel in Houston, Texas, United States.  It is operated by Four Seasons Hotels and Resorts. The hotel includes Four Seasons Place, a group of 64 apartment units, and an Italian restaurant. It is a part of the Houston Center complex.

History
Four Seasons Hotel Houston opened in 1982. It became the city's first AAA Five-Diamond hotel in 1996. In 2000, Crescent Real Estate Equities, the owner of Houston Center, sold the Four Seasons Hotel Houston to Maritz, Wolff & Co., a hotel investment group, for $105 million.

In 2006, Institutional Investor ranked Four Seasons Hotel Houston the 87th "Best Hotel in the World". The hotel currently houses 404 guest rooms, including 12 suites, throughout 30 floors.

In 2013, Maritz, Wolff & Co. sold the property to Cascade Investment. Four Seasons Hotels and Resorts, owned jointly by Cascade, Kingdom Holding Company and Triples Holdings, will continue to manage the hotel.

Amenities
The hotel's restaurant, Quattro, features an Italian-style menu. The Mobil Four Star restaurant offers breakfast, lunch, dinner and an antipasto bar.

The hotel has 289 rooms and 115 suits, in addition to 64 apartment units at the Four Seasons Place, a total of 468 guest accommodations.

Zoned schools
The Four Seasons Place apartments are zoned to Houston Independent School District schools. Residents are zoned to  Gregory Lincoln Education Center (Grades K-8), and Northside High School (formerly Jefferson Davis High School).

By Spring 2011, Atherton Elementary School and E.O. Smith Education Center were consolidated with a new K-5 campus in the Atherton site. As a result, the building was rezoned from Smith to Gregory Lincoln for the middle school level. Previously it was zoned to Bruce Elementary. As part of rezoning for the 2014–2015 school year, this tower was rezoned from Bruce to Gregory-Lincoln K-8 for elementary school.

In popular culture
In the second volume of Scarlet Spider published by Marvel Comics, Kaine Parker stays in this hotel.

On the lead single for Hobo Johnson on his second studio album The Fall of Hobo Johnson Frank, a.k.a. Hobo Johnson references his experience at The Four Seasons Hotel.

See also

References

Hotel buildings completed in 1982
Buildings and structures in Houston
Four Seasons hotels and resorts
Hotels established in 1982
Hotels in Houston
1982 establishments in Texas
Residential skyscrapers in Houston
Skyscraper hotels in Houston